The City Municipality of Nova Gorica is a municipality in the traditional region of the Slovene Littoral in western Slovenia. The seat of the municipality is the city of Nova Gorica. Nova Gorica became a municipality in 1994.

Settlements
In addition to the municipal seat of Nova Gorica, the municipality also includes the following settlements:

 Ajševica
 Banjšice
 Bate
 Branik
 Brdo
 Budihni
 Čepovan
 Dornberk
 Draga
 Dragovica
 Gradišče nad Prvačino
 Grgar
 Grgarske Ravne
 Kromberk
 Lazna
 Loke
 Lokovec
 Lokve
 Nemci
 Osek
 Ozeljan
 Pedrovo
 Podgozd
 Potok pri Dornberku
 Preserje
 Pristava
 Prvačina
 Ravnica
 Rožna Dolina
 Saksid
 Šempas
 Šmaver
 Šmihel
 Solkan
 Spodnja Branica
 Stara Gora
 Steske
 Sveta Gora
 Tabor
 Trnovo
 Vitovlje
 Voglarji
 Zalošče

Politics 
The municipality of Nova Gorica is governed by a mayor, elected every four years by popular vote, and a city council of 32 members. Both in local and national elections, Nova Gorica has been considered an electoral stronghold of the left, in particular of the Social Democrats. Between the early 1990s and the mid-2000s, the two major political parties in the town were the Social Democrats and Liberal Democracy of Slovenia, both considered center-left parties. Since 1994, these two parties have been alternating in power at the local level, running candidates against each other and forming coalitions with smaller center-right parties in order to gain an absolute majority in the city council.

The Nova Gorica electoral district is the home district of Borut Pahor, former prime minister and current president of Slovenia; it was also the only district in the country where the Social Democrats won the plurality of votes in the 2011 elections.

References

External links

City Municipality of Nova Gorica on Geopedia
Nova Gorica municipal site

 
Nova Gorica
1994 establishments in Slovenia